Île Haute is one of the Kerguelen Islands situated in the Golfe du Morbihan near the coast of Grande Terre, the principal island.

It is around 6 km long and 2 km wide. The highest point is the Table des Mouflons, at 321 metres.

References
 General view of non-metropolitan France, Maison de la Géographie.

Haute